Treyer is a last name of German origin. Other forms of the name are "Dreier" and "Dreyer". The Pennsylvania German form of it is "Troyer". Hans Treyer, an early Anabaptist leader, died as a martyr of his faith in Bern in 1529.

Treyer  is the last name of:
 Gottlieb Treyer (1790–1869), a German-born British snuff manufacturer and retailer.
 Tobias Treyer, Swiss curler.

See also
 Fribourg & Treyer, a former British snuff manufacturer and retailer.

References